Siege of Tbilisi may refer to:

 Siege of Tbilisi (1122), successful siege of the city of Tbilisi, capital of the Emirate of Tbilisi, by the Georgians under King David IV
 Siege of Tbilisi (1386), successful Timurid attack on the capital of Kingdom of Georgia
 Battle of Krtsanisi, part of Persian invasion of Kingdom of Kartli-Kakheti